The 1894 baseball season was the Philadelphia Phillies' 12th season in the National League. The team finished in fourth place with a record of 71–57, 18 games behind the Baltimore Orioles.  In August, the Phillies scored 312 runs, which still stands as the record in Major League Baseball for runs scored in a single month. Four of the team's outfielders hit over .400: Hall of Famers Sam Thompson, Ed Delehanty, and Billy Hamilton, plus reserve Tuck Turner. The Phillies set the record for the highest team batting average for a single season, .349 according to Baseball Almanac or .350 according to Stathead.

Following a fire which destroyed their ballpark on August 6, the Phillies played half a dozen home games at the University of Pennsylvania athletic field. They were especially productive there, winning five of the six games, and outscoring their opponents 93 to 35, including one game they won 29 to 4.

Regular season

Season standings

Record vs. opponents

Roster

Player stats

Batting

Starters by position 
Note: Pos = Position; G = Games played; AB = At bats; H = Hits; Avg. = Batting average; HR = Home runs; RBI = Runs batted in

Other batters 
Note: G = Games played; AB = At bats; H = Hits; Avg. = Batting average; HR = Home runs; RBI = Runs batted in

Pitching

Starting pitchers 
Note: G = Games pitched; IP = Innings pitched; W = Wins; L = Losses; ERA = Earned run average; SO = Strikeouts

Other pitchers 
Note: G = Games pitched; IP = Innings pitched; W = Wins; L = Losses; ERA = Earned run average; SO = Strikeouts

Relief pitchers 
Note: G = Games pitched; W = Wins; L = Losses; SV = Saves; ERA = Earned run average; SO = Strikeouts

References 

1894 Philadelphia Phillies season at Baseball Reference
Runs scored records at Baseball Almanac

Philadelphia Phillies seasons
Philadelphia Phillies season
Philly